The women's javelin throw (weigh 600 grams as senior level) at the 2018 IAAF World U20 Championships was held at Ratina Stadium on 10 and 11 July.

Records

Results

Qualification
The qualification round took place on 10 July, in two groups, with Group A starting at 09:00 and Group B starting at 10:20. Athletes attaining a mark of at least 53.50 metres( Q ) or at least the 12 best performers ( q ) qualified for the final. The overall results were as follows:

Final
The final was held on 11 July at 18:50.

References

javelin throw
Javelin throw at the World Athletics U20 Championships